Many television films have been produced for Disney Channel, an American family-oriented basic cable channel and former premium television channel since its launch on April 18, 1983. Until October 1997, films were released under the banner name of Disney Channel Premiere Films; since then, the films are currently released under the Disney Channel Original Movie (DCOM) banner.

Most of these films were subsequently released on VHS, DVD, or, more recently, Blu-ray. However, many more entries in the Disney Channel film library were never released in any home video format. Originally, the films were released on DVD months after their Disney Channel premieres, but beginning with Princess Protection Program in 2009, DVDs for DCOMs have been released one week after their television premieres. Also, although DCOMs have been produced in widescreen HD format since mid-2005, the 2009 release of Princess Protection Program became the first DCOM to appear in widescreen DVD viewing format.

The highest-rated premiere for the banner/brand came in August 2007, when High School Musical 2 set a record for basic cable with 17.2 million viewers. The second highest-rated premiere is held by Wizards of Waverly Place: The Movie, which premiered with 11.4 million viewers. Other major DCOM franchises include Camp Rock, The Cheetah Girls, Twitches, Halloweentown, the Teen Beach films, the Zenon and Zombies trilogies, and the Descendants series.

During the Memorial Day holiday weekend of 2016, Disney Channel began to air many older DCOMs in a specialized marathon programming block in celebration of its 100th film, Adventures in Babysitting. Disney Channel broadcast all previous 99 Disney Channel Original Movies that came before it, beginning with the 51 most popular films airing over the four-day weekend, beginning May 27, 2016 and continuing throughout the following month until the June 24 premiere of the aforementioned 100th Disney Channel Original Movie.

Disney Channel Premiere Films

 Notes

Disney Channel Original Movies

Notes

Upcoming Disney Channel Original Movies

Notable non-Disney Channel Original Movie films
The following films were not originally premiered under the "Disney Channel Original Movie" label, though they were sometimes later promoted as such:

 Harriet the Spy: Blog Wars (March 26, 2010)
 16 Wishes (June 25, 2010)
 Back of the Net (June 15, 2019)

Highest-rated Disney Channel Original Movie (DCOM) premieres

Top 10

While Descendants 2, which aired in July 2017, only drew 5.3 million viewers on the Disney Channel, it was simultaneously aired on the ABC broadcast network (where it drew an average of 2.4 million viewers) and four other cable channels (Disney XD, Freeform, Lifetime, and Lifetime Movies) as well, and drew a combined viewership of 8.9 million across all six television networks.

Within a calendar year

See also

 Disney Channel
 List of Disney novelizations
 List of programs broadcast by Disney Channel

References

External links
Available DCOMs on DisneyNow
 DCOM menu on Disney Channel shows website
 Full List of Disney Channel Original Movies and DVD Statuses at Ultimate Disney
 

 
 
Disney Channel Original Movies
Disney Channel Original Movies